Dimetamine may refer to:

 A brand name of propylhexedrine 
 A slang name for the synthetic opioid 4-dimethylamino-4-(p-tolyl)cyclohexanone
 Dimetamine (alkaloid), an alkaloid isolated from Thermopsis alterniflora